The Salt Fork Red River is a sandy-braided stream about  long, heading on the Llano Estacado of West Texas about  north of Claude of Armstrong County, Texas, flowing east across the Texas Panhandle and Western Oklahoma to join the Red River about  south of Altus of Jackson County, Oklahoma.

Course
The Salt Fork Red River rises in northern Armstrong County, Texas just to the south of Carson County, Texas. It flows southeast across Donley and Collingsworth County, Texas. Crossing into Oklahoma at the 100th meridian, it flows through Harmon County and Greer County, Oklahoma.

See also
Double Mountain Fork Brazos River
Geography of Oklahoma
List of rivers in Oklahoma
List of Texas rivers
Llano Estacado
Palo Duro Canyon
Prairie Dog Town Fork Red River
Salt Fork Brazos River
Yellow House Canyon
White River (Texas)

References

External links
 Handbook of Texas
Oklahoma Digital Maps: Digital Collections of Oklahoma and Indian Territory

Rivers of Oklahoma
Rivers of Texas
Tributaries of the Red River of the South
Rivers of Armstrong County, Texas
Rivers of Jackson County, Oklahoma